Pickle plant is a common name for several plants and may refer to:

 Delosperma echinatum, a succulent plant native to South Africa
 Kleinia stapeliiformis, a succulent plant native to South Africa
 Oxalis stricta, which has sour-tasting cucumber-shaped seed pods